Pune City taluka is the main taluka in the Pune district of state of Maharashtra in India.

This taluka is the administrative block for the City of Pune as defined by the State of Maharashtra. The local governance of the City of Pune is governed by the Pune Municipal Corporation, while the taluka officials are appointed by the State Govt. The Pune municipal corporation cannot grow beyond the boundaries of the Pune City taluka.

References

Talukas in Pune district
Talukas in Maharashtra